Theoretical Linguistics is an international peer-reviewed journal of theoretical linguistics published by Mouton de Gruyter. Since 2001, Manfred Krifka (Humboldt University of Berlin) has been its editor. 

In 2020, the journal's impact factor was 1.929, as reported by Journal Citation Reports.

The journal publishes four issues per year. Each issue contains one main article, and a number of shorter responses to that article.

References

Linguistics journals
Publications established in 1975
English-language journals
Triannual journals
De Gruyter academic journals